The discography of Paris Hilton, an American media personality, socialite and singer, consists of one studio album, eleven singles and fifteen music videos. Hilton founded Heiress Records, a sub-label of Warner Bros. Records, and released her self-titled debut album under the label on August 22, 2006. It peaked at number six on the US Billboard 200, selling 77,000 copies in its first week of release. In the US, the album has sold 200,000 copies. Paris also peaked within the top twenty on the album charts in the UK, New Zealand, Germany, Austria, Finland, Denmark, Sweden, Switzerland and Canada where it reached number four. Following the release of her debut album, Hilton has stated in interviews that she would like to record a second album.

Studio albums

Singles

As lead artist

As featured artist

Promotional singles

Guest appearances

Videography

Music videos

Guest appearances

Footnotes

References

Discographies of American artists
Pop music discographies
Paris Hilton